Baron Somers, of Evesham in the County of Worcester, is a title that has been created twice. The title was first created in the Peerage of England in 1697 for Sir John Somers, so that he could sit in the House of Lords and serve as Lord Chancellor. The title became extinct on Lord Somers' death in 1716. His sister and co-heiress, Mary Somers, married Charles Cocks, a member of a prominent Worcestershire family. Their grandson Charles Cocks represented Reigate in Parliament from 1747 to 1784, and was created a baronet, of Dumbleton in the County of Gloucester, in the Baronetage of Great Britain in 1772. In 1784 the barony held by his great-uncle was revived when he was made Baron Somers, of Evesham in the County of Worcester, in the Peerage of Great Britain.

His eldest son, the second Baron, sat as a Member of Parliament for West Looe, Grampound and Reigate and also served as Lord Lieutenant of Herefordshire. In 1821 he was created Viscount Eastnor, of Eastnor Castle in the County of Hereford, and Earl Somers. Both titles were in the Peerage of the United Kingdom. He was succeeded by his son, the second Earl. He represented Reigate and Hereford in the House of Commons and like his father served as Lord Lieutenant of Herefordshire. In 1841 Lord Somers assumed by Royal licence the additional surname of Somers. His son, the third Earl, sat as a Conservative Member of Parliament for Reigate.

However, on his death in 1883, the viscountcy and earldom became extinct. He was succeeded in the baronetcy and barony by his first cousin once removed, the fifth Baron. He was the son of Philip James Cocks, third son of the first Baron. On his death, the title passed to his great-nephew, the sixth Baron. He was a Conservative politician and also served as Governor of Victoria. He was succeeded by his uncle, the seventh Baron. His son, the eighth Baron, was a professor at the Royal College of Music. On his death in 1995, the titles passed to his second cousin once removed, the ninth and  present holder of the baronetcy and barony. He is a great-grandson of John James Thomas Somers Cocks, younger brother of the fifth Baron.

The ancestral seat of the Cocks family was Eastnor Castle in Herefordshire. It is now in the hands of a female-line grandson of the sixth Baron Somers.

The title of the barony is pronounced "Summers".

Barons Somers, first creation (1697)
John Somers, 1st Baron Somers (1651–1716)

Barons Somers, second creation (1784)
Charles Cocks, 1st Baron Somers (1725–1806)
John Somers Cocks, 2nd Baron Somers (1760–1841) (created Earl Somers in 1821)

Earl Somers (1821)
John Somers Cocks, 1st Earl Somers (1760–1841)
John Somers Somers-Cocks, 2nd Earl Somers (1788–1852)
Charles Somers Somers-Cocks, 3rd Earl Somers (1819–1883)

Barons Somers, second creation (1784; reverted)
Philip Reginald Cocks, 5th Baron Somers (1815–1899)
Arthur Herbert Tennyson Somers-Cocks, 6th Baron Somers (1887–1944)
Arthur Percy Somers Cocks, 7th Baron Somers (1864–1953)
John Patrick Somers Cocks, 8th Baron Somers (1907–1995)
Philip Sebastian Somers-Cocks, 9th Baron Somers (born 1948)

The heir presumptive to the barony is the present holder's fourth cousin three times removed, Jonathan Bromley Cocks (b. 1985). He is a seventh-generation descendant of Reginald Cocks, the youngest son of the first Baron.

Notes

References

 
 
 

1697 establishments in England
Extinct baronies in the Peerage of England
Baronies in the Peerage of Great Britain
Noble titles created in 1784
Noble titles created in 1697